Tagesschau24 (stylized as tagesschau24) is a German free-to-air television channel owned by ARD and managed by Norddeutscher Rundfunk. It was launched on 30 August 1997 as "EinsExtra" before the introduction of its current name on 1 May 2012.

It is ARD's news channel and competes with Welt and n-tv. Besides news, Tagesschau24 also broadcasts culture, sports and science shows. An HD simulcast of the channel was launched on 5 December 2013.

History 
The ARD digital broadcaster started on 30 August 1997 under the name EinsExtra. EinsExtra was positioned as information channel. Until 2006, the network's programming consisted largely of re-airings of morning shows, talk shows and documentaries from Das Erste and the regional Drittes Fernsehprogramm. From 2006 to 2009, the channel turned itself into an all news network, with the launch of a new-centred show, EinsExtra Aktuell. On 1 May 2012, EinsExtra Aktuell was rebranded as tagesschau24.

In February 2022, it was announced that ARD was converting tagesschau24 into a 24/7 news channel by 2023.

The studio should be staffed around the clock. There will be 19 hours all day live shows in the studio with talks, news and breaking news. In addition, there should be a live news edition of the Tagesschau every half hour during the night.

On November 15th 2022, tagesschau24 closed its SDTV feed across cable and satellite, but the SD feed still works on antennas,

Logos 

In May 2014, the "tagesschau" and the ARD trademark were deleted from the logo. For the HD variant, "HD" is below the 24 in the semicircle.

Audience share

Germany

References

External links
 

ARD (broadcaster)
Television channels and stations established in 1997
Mass media in Hamburg
German-language television stations
24-hour television news channels in Germany
1997 establishments in Germany